Sergi Vidal Plana (born April 9, 1981) is a Spanish retired professional basketball player, who played at the shooting guard and small forward positions.

Professional career
Vidal signed with the Spanish League giants Real Madrid in August 2009, after having spent nine years with Baskonia, the club with which he was the team captain. On September 13, 2018, he part ways with Divina Seguros Joventut and in the next day, he signed with Cafés Candelas Breogán.

On September 23, 2019, he has signed with Montakit Fuenlabrada of the Liga ACB. 

Finally, on 17 December 2019, Vidal announced his retirement from professional basketball.

Spain national team
Vidal was a member of the senior Spain national basketball team at the 2005 FIBA EuroBasket.

References

External links
ACB.com Profile
Basketpedya.com Profile
Euroleague.net Profile
Draftexpress.com Profile

1981 births
Living people
Bàsquet Manresa players
Baloncesto Fuenlabrada players
Baloncesto Málaga players
Basketball players from Catalonia
Gipuzkoa Basket players
Joventut Badalona players
Liga ACB players
People from Badalona
Sportspeople from the Province of Barcelona
Real Madrid Baloncesto players
Saski Baskonia players
Shooting guards
Small forwards
Spanish men's basketball players